Mudhafar Jabbar Tawfik (born 11 January 1965) is an Iraqi footballer. He competed in the men's tournament at the 1988 Summer Olympics. Mudhafar Jabbar is coaching Al-Hudood now.

Career statistics

International goals
Scores and results list Iraq's goal tally first.

Managerial statistics

References

External links
 
 
 

1965 births
Living people
Iraqi footballers
Iraq international footballers
Olympic footballers of Iraq
Footballers at the 1988 Summer Olympics
Place of birth missing (living people)
Association football defenders
Al-Rasheed players
Al-Karkh SC players
Iraqi football managers
Al-Talaba SC managers